Bernard Harris (born 25 August 1962) is a former Australian rules footballer who played with Fitzroy, the Brisbane Bears and St Kilda in the Victorian/Australian Football League (VFL/AFL).

Harris joined his elder brother Leon at Fitzroy in 1984, having previously played in Mortlake. A rover, he kicked more than 20 goals in a season on four occasions during his league career. He received three Brownlow Medal votes for his four goals and 26 disposals in a win over Sydney at the SCG in 1985 and participated in the 1986 finals series with Fitzroy.

In 1987 he was signed by Brisbane for their inaugural VFL season and had the distinction of kicking the club's first ever goal. Harris kicked six goals in a game against St Kilda that year. He left Brisbane halfway through the 1990 season and saw out the year at St Kilda after they picked him up in the Mid-Season draft.

References

1962 births
Australian rules footballers from Victoria (Australia)
Fitzroy Football Club players
Brisbane Bears players
St Kilda Football Club players
Mortlake Football Club players
Living people